Hassan Mahmood Khandker is a former Bangladeshi police officer who served as the 26th Inspector General of Bangladesh Police from 31 August 2010 to 30 December 2014. He was the longest serving Inspector General in Bangladesh Police's history. It was during his tenure that Bangladesh Police got  Independence Day Award. Moreover, rank badge of the IGP upgraded to 3-star general in his time, earlier IGP was bearing two-star general rank badge since 1983.

Early life and career
Khandker born in Pirgachha Upazila in Rangpur district. He completed his bachelor's and master's degrees in English from the University of Dhaka.

Khandker joined the police department in 1984 as a member of the Bangladesh Civil Service cadre of the 1982 batch. He served as director general of Rapid Action Battalion during February 2007 to August 2010. He received the Bangladesh Police Medal and the President Police Medal. During his tenure as the IGP, Bangladesh Police received the Independence Day Award.

Khandker was appointed as the ambassador of Bangladesh to Spain in 2015.

Khandker has charges against him in International Criminal Court (ICC) for crimes against humanity.

References

Living people
People from Rangpur District
University of Dhaka alumni
Inspectors General of Police (Bangladesh)
Ambassadors of Bangladesh to Spain
Date of birth missing (living people)
Year of birth missing (living people)